František Hanec Pivec was a male Czech international table tennis player.

He won a bronze medal at the 1936 World Table Tennis Championships in the team event and another bronze in 1937 World Table Tennis Championships doubles with Miloslav Hamr.

See also
 List of table tennis players
 List of World Table Tennis Championships medalists

References

Czech male table tennis players
World Table Tennis Championships medalists